Budarasingi is a village in Mandasa mandal of Srikakulam district, Andhra Pradesh, India. Lal Mohan Patnaik was born in this village in 1891 who was the Second Speaker of Odisha Legislative Assembly from 29 May 1946 to 6 March 1952.

Geography
It has an average elevation of 50 meters (167 feet).

Demographics
 Indian census, the demographic details of Budarasingi village is as follows:
 Total Population: 	2,418 in 564 Households
 Male Population: 	1,202 and Female Population: 	1,216
 Children Under 6-years of age: 360 (Boys - 	172 and Girls - 	188)
 Total Literates: 	1,042

References

Villages in Srikakulam district